Capnolymma brunnea is a species of beetle in the family Cerambycidae. It was described by Gressitt and Rondon in 1970.

References

Beetles described in 1970
Lepturinae